Mixed Blood Majority is an American hip hop group from Minneapolis, Minnesota. Their members include producer Lazerbeak of Doomtree, rapper Crescent Moon of Kill the Vultures and rapper Joe Horton of No Bird Sing. The group has shared stages with well known artists such as Sage Francis, P.O.S, Aceyalone, and Slick Rick.

History 
Mixed Blood Majority released their first solo album, Mixed Blood Majority, in 2013.

Their second solo album, Insane World, was released in 2015.

Discography

Albums 
 Mixed Blood Majority (2013)
 Insane World (2015)

References

External links 
 Mixed Blood Majority on F to I to X
 
 

American hip hop groups
Musical groups from Minnesota
American musical trios